Nikolai Mikhailovich Denisov (born 1891 in Moscow; died 1959 in Moscow) was an association football player.

International career
Denisov made his debut for Russia on 14 September 1913 in a friendly against Norway.

External links
  Profile

1891 births
1959 deaths
Russian footballers
Russia international footballers
Association football forwards